Reassemblage may refer to:

 A second or subsequent assemblage
 Reassemblage (film), groundbreaking 1982 documentary film
 Reassemblage (album), 2017 new age album by Visible Cloaks named after the film